International Expo Center station may refer to:

 International Expo Center station (Chongqing Rail Transit), a station on Line 6 (Chongqing Rail Transit)
 , a station on Line 2 (Nanchang Metro).